Jakob Caironi (5 May 1902 – November 1968) was a Swiss cyclist. He competed in the individual and team road race events at the 1928 Summer Olympics.

References

External links
 

1902 births
1968 deaths
Swiss male cyclists
Olympic cyclists of Switzerland
Cyclists at the 1928 Summer Olympics
People from Bülach
Sportspeople from the canton of Zürich